Newquay is a town  on the north coast in Cornwall, in the south west of England.

The town is bounded to the south by the River Gannel and its associated salt marsh, and to the north-east by the Porth Valley. The western edge of the town meets the Atlantic at Fistral Bay. The town has been expanding inland (south) since the former fishing village of New Quay began to grow in the second half of the nineteenth century.

In 2001, the census recorded a permanent population of 19,562, increasing to 20,342 at the 2011 census. Recent estimates suggest that the total population for the wider Newquay area (Newquay and St Columb Community Network Area ) was 27,682 in 2017, projected to rise to 33,463 by 2025.

History

Prehistoric period 
There are some pre-historic burial mounds and an embankment on the area now known as The Barrowfields,  from Trevelgue. There were once up to fifteen barrows, but now only a few remain. Excavations here have revealed charred cooking pots and a coarse pottery burial urn containing remains of a Bronze Age chieftain, who was buried here up to 3,500 years ago.

In 1987, evidence of a Bronze Age village was found at Trethellan Farm, a site that overlooks the River Gannel.

The first signs of settlement in the Newquay region consist of a late Iron Age hill fort/industrial centre which exploited the nearby abundant resources (including deposits of iron) and the superior natural defences provided by Trevelgue Head. It is claimed that occupation of the site was continuous from the 3rd century BC to the 5th or 6th century AD. A Dark Ages house was later built on the head.

Medieval period
The curve of the headland is  around what is now known as  Newquay harbour provided natural protection from bad weather and a small fishing village grew up in the area. When the village was first occupied is unknown but it is not mentioned in the Domesday Book, although a parcel of land was recorded at Treninnick, which is now part of suburban Newquay. Treninnick was then part of the manor of Coswarth and consisted of one virgate (value 15d) [some 30 acres or 12 hectares] with five sheep. The village of Crantock is the only other recognisable name in the Newquay area also recorded in Domesday, (as “Langoroch”). By the 15th century, a village referred to as “Keye” existed around the present harbour, near “Tewynblustri” (the spelling changed as Cornish evolved and is now rendered as “Towan Blystra”). “Towan” (or Tewynn) means dune or sand hill in Cornish, but the meaning of “blustri” or “blystra” is unknown. Some sources have suggested in the past that it meant boats, but this claim is not supported by modern authorities and is dismissed by Padel in his dictionary of Cornish place names. The name 'Towan Blystra', although often quoted as the Cornish equivalent of Newquay, was actually the name of the manor which was the area around the harbour. A separate settlement called 'Towan' was some 200m away from the harbour. There is no record of ‘Newquay’ as a name ever being rendered in Cornish. The anchorage was exposed to winds from the north east and in 1439 the local burgesses applied to Edmund Lacey, Bishop of Exeter for leave and funds raised through the mechanism of an indulgence, to build a new quay from which the town derives its name. The name 'new quay' itself did not appear until the early 17th century.

1755 

A Cornish antiquarian by the name of Dr William Borlase visited the settlements of Towan and New Key in 1755.

1801–1900

The first national British census of 1801 recorded around 1,300 inhabitants in the settlement (enumerated as a village under St Columb Minor parish).

In 1832 the London based entrepreneur Richard Lomax bought the manor of Towan Blystra that included the small harbour at what was becoming known as New Key.

The proposal included an overview of the hamlets of New Key and Towan and the track that associated both settlements.It additionally shows the few buildings that include the Inn, (the Central), cottages along what would become Bank Street and commercial buildings narrated to the catching fish industry as an example cellars. Lomax began the construction of the north and south quay,  He died in 1837 before the harbour was completed.

The harbour was at its most prosperous in the 25 years following its purchase in the 1870s by the Cornwall Minerals Railway. In 1872 the middle jetty was added to expand capacity.

To the north of the harbour there were fish cellars in the 19th century, where pilchards were salted and packed in casks. The two remaining areas are Fly cellars and Active cellars, although the others have disappeared.

A mansion called the Tower was built for the Molesworth family in 1835: it included a castellated tower and a private chapel as they were practising Roman Catholics and no church for that denomination existed in the area. The Tower later became the golf club house. After the arrival of passenger trains in 1876, the village around the port of Newquay started to grow quickly.

Several major hotels were built around the end of the 19th century, the first being the Great Western Hotel which opened in 1879 on Station Road, now Cliff Road. Other early 'grand' hotels included the Victoria (1899), the Atlantic (1892) and the Headland (1900) near Fistral, while many smaller hotels were emerging, many were created around this period by converting large houses, with many originally built by wealthy visitors as holiday homes, particularly along Narrowcliff.

1901–2000

Three churches were built early in the twentieth century, including the present day parish church of St Michael the Archangel, which was consecrated in 1911. Growth of the town eastwards soon reached the area around the railway station: Station Road became Cliff Road around 1930, and the houses beyond, along Narrowcliff, were also converted into hotels. Narrowcliff was known for a while as Narrowcliff Promenade, and then Narrowcliff Road. On some pre-war maps, it is spelt Narrowcliffe.

At the time of the First World War the last buildings at the edge of the town were a little further along present-day Narrowcliff, including the Hotel Edgcumbe. This thoroughfare was modernised and named Henver Road, also some time in the 1930s. Development continued in this direction until the Second World War, by which time much of Henver Road had houses on both sides, with considerable infilling also taking place between there and the sea.

A thriving knitting industry became established in Newquay in the early part of the 20th century. In 1905, Madame Hawke began selling machine-knitted garments in a shop in the centre of the town. Debenhams was sent a sample of her work and commissioned her as a supplier. She opened a factory in Crantock Street, which has since been converted into housing. Several competing knitting companies were also set up in the town in this period.

In the early 1950s, the last houses were built along Henver Road. After that, there was a virtually continuous building line on both sides of the main road from the other side of St Columb Minor right into the town centre. The Doublestiles estate to the north of Henver Road was also built in the early 1950s, as the name of Coronation Way indicates, and further development continued beyond, becoming the Lewarne Estate and extending the built up area to the edges of Porth.

Other areas also developed in the period between the wars were Pentire (known for a time as West Newquay) and the Trenance Valley. Other streets dating from the 1920s included St Thomas Road, which provided the approach to the town's new cottage hospital at its far end, to be followed by others in the same area near the station, such as Pargolla Road.

More recent development has been on a larger scale: until the late 1960s, a passenger arriving by train would not have seen a building by the line (with the exception of Trencreek village) until the Trenance Viaduct was reached. Other growth areas have been on the fringes of St Columb Minor and also towards the Gannel. More development beyond Treninnick, south of the Trenance Valley, has taken the urban area out as far as Lane, where more building is now under way. The Trennnick/Treloggan development, mainly in the 1970s and 1980s, included not merely housing but also an industrial estate and several large commercial outlets, including a major supermarket and a cash and carry warehouse.

Modern period since 2001
One of the UK's worst hotel fires occurred in the town in 2007 in the Penhallow Hotel fire.

The first phase of a new Duchy of Cornwall development began to be built in 2012 at Tregunnel Hill, which was sometimes unofficially called Surfbury after the similar Poundbury development in Dorset. It has 174 houses of traditional designs.

There is now a similar but much more substantial development in progress inland, and construction on a large site known as Nansledan (‘broad valley’ in Cornish) is now apparent along the Quintrell Road. Plans were approved for the development of 800 homes at Nansledan in December 2013, but the plan now includes more than 4,000 homes, shops, a supermarket, church and a 14-classroom primary school which opened to its first pupils in September 2019. Following the example set at Tregunnel Hill, the buildings are again of traditional designs and all street names are in Cornish.

Places like Trencreek, Porth and St Columb Minor have long since become suburbs of Newquay: it had been reported that it was possible that by the 2030s, should present development trends continue, the south eastern edge of the town could stretch beyond the present boundary set by Nansledan and encompass Quintrell Downs,  from the town centre. However, the Newquay Neighbourhood Development Plan, which was approved in a referendum held on 6 April 2019, said it was important to retain a 'green buffer' between Newquay and Quintrell Downs.

In April 2012 the Aerohub enterprise zone for aerospace businesses was set up at Newquay Airport. In September 2014, the UK's Homes and Communities Agency and the European Regional Development Fund agreed to fund the construction of a £6 million Aerohub Business Park there. A plan to launch space vehicles from a new spaceport alongside the airport moved ahead in July 2018 when a contract was signed with Virgin Orbit. The first launch from the spaceport, named Spaceport Cornwall, took place on 9 January 2023. The initial launch of the LauncherOne rocket from the carrier aircraft, Cosmic Girl, was successful but the rocket's second stage suffered an anomaly and the vehicle and payload satellites failed to reach orbit.

Local Government 

The Borough of Restormel was one of the six administrative divisions that made up the county. It formed on 1 April 1974, under the Local Government Act 1972, by the merger of the borough of St. Austell with Fowey, Newquay urban district and St Austell Rural District. The district was abolished as part of the 2009 structural changes to local government in England on 1 April 2009. Cornwall became a unitary authority and there has been a two-tier structure of local government: Cornwall Council (administers, for example, schools and highways, housing, social services, harbour, refuse and recycling collection, street cleanliness; the town is represented by the Newquay division)  

In 2010 the St Austell and Newquay Parliament constituency was formed.

Steve Double has been the Member of Parliament (MP) for St Austell and Newquay since 2015.

Churches

The first Methodist preaching at Newquay was recorded by Richard Treffy in 1802, an innkeeper, Carter, being the host. In 1810, preacher William O'Bryan came to Newquay and formed the nucleus of the first Methodist Society. The Society, later known as the Bible Christians or 'Bryanites', built a chapel in the Deer Park, now Sydney Road.

The Baptists were the first to have a building. The Newquay Baptist Church, formerly the Ebenezer Baptist Chapel founded in 1822, is one of the oldest religious buildings in Newquay. The worshippers at Ebenezer were Strict and Particular, or Calvinistic Baptists.

The first Methodist chapel was built in 1833, at a cost of £170. It was originally built as Crantock Street Methodist Chapel in 1833, the second such Methodist building in Newquay. Some members left in 1852, while the rest moved to the Steps Chapel in 1865. Following a visit by General Bramwell Booth in 1924, the building was taken over by the Salvation Army in 1926, just as the mineral railway it overlooked was being closed down.

Before the Baptist chapel was built the Strict Baptists formed themselves into a community and met for worship in the old malthouse opposite Primrose House on Beach Road. They had a regular Sunday supply of preachers from Plymouth, Torquay, and Truro. 

The first Anglican chapel was built in Newquay in 1858 as a chapel-of-ease, in a fine Cornish Perpendicular style; it was known as St Michael's due to the dedication of a side chapel. The parish itself was created in 1882 from part of St Columb Minor parish. By 1896 St Michael's Church had been twice enlarged, a north and a south aisle being added, and its capacity increased to 500. By the turn of the 19th century, however, it was quite inadequate to hold the summer congregation. The cramped and inconvenient site meant that no further enlargement of the chapel was possible, and it seemed inevitable that a new church would have to be built on a different site. The present church, the Newquay Parish Church of St Michael the Archangel is dedicated to St. Michael the Archangel, was originally designed by Ninian Comper and built in 1910-11, but the tower not completed until the 1960s. Arthur Mee, in his Cornwall volume of the King's England series, describes the perpetual light maintained in the church as a memorial to the men of Newquay who died in the First World War. The stained glass windows and rood screen are also described: the main themes are St Michael, the three other archangels, and Jesus Christ and Mary the Blessed Virgin. The St Michael, chapel-of-ease continued to serve the people of Newquay until 1911 when the chapel was sold to the Women's Institute which owned it for a number of years until it was sold again to FW Woolworth for a new Woolworths store. The chapel was demolished in 1937.

The Roman Catholic Church of the Holy Trinity is earlier, having been built in 1903: until 1985 it was dependent on monks from Bodmin but then became part of the Diocese of Plymouth.

There have also been Wesleyan and Bible Christian chapels in the town, the Wesleyan being a fine (picturesque) building of 1904.

Tourism

Newquay has been a major tourist destination for more than a century, principally on account of its coastline and nine long and accessible sandy beaches, including Fistral.

Around 25,000 people live in Newquay, but the population can increase to 100,000 or more in the summer because Newquay has a large stock of holiday accommodation.

Established in sections throughout the 20th century, Trenance Leisure Gardens are in a wooded, formerly marshy valley on the quieter edge of Newquay, stretching down to the Gannel Estuary. From the Edwardian era it provided recreation for tourists with walks, tennis courts and a bowling green. The gardens are spanned by a stone railway viaduct which was rebuilt just before the Second World War. The boating lake was dug during the depression of the 1930s as a work creation scheme. In the late 1960s, further enterprises were established by the council, including mini-golf, a swimming pool, the Little Western Railway miniature railway which opened in 1968 and Newquay Zoo, which opened in 1969.

Newquay was also known for the "Run to the Sun" event, which began on Fistral Beach in 1987 and then took place for many years during the public holiday on the last weekend in May at Trevelgue Holiday Park. People visited the town in Volkswagen camper vans, Volkswagen Beetles and other custom cars. The last RTTS took place in 2014, but it was announced in early 2023 that the event would return on 27 May to a new site at St Mawgan, just outside Newquay. 

Other events in recent times have included the large Boardmasters music festival, which attracts another 50,000 visitors over one weekend in early August and is held on sites at Watergate Bay (outside the urban area) and Fistral Beach. Cornwall Pride moved to Newquay from Truro in 2017, and this took place in 2018 on the last Saturday in August.

The  South West Coast Path runs through the town.

Town trail
Newquay Discovery Trail is made up of 14 Cornish slate discs, each  in diameter, sunk into the ground at strategic points around the town. Each of the discs features a series of 'conundrum' words carved by sculptor Peter Martin. The trail starts in the centre of town at the Killacourt.

Education
Newquay currently has one higher education campus, Cornwall College Newquay, which is a member of the Combined Universities in Cornwall Partnership. It offers foundation degree courses in Zoological Conservation, Marine Aquaculture, Animal Science and Wildlife Education and Media. Appropriately, the campus is close to Newquay Zoo in the Trenance Valley. There are also two secondary schools: Newquay Tretherras is a state-funded academy with specialist Technology College status, and Treviglas Academy is a specialist Business and Enterprise College.

A new centre of higher education for Newquay had been due to open alongside the Airport and Spaceport (see Transport for details) in 2020, to be known as the International Aviation Academy and attached to RAF St Mawgan. It will cater for students who wish to gain air- or space-related qualifications. The project has been delayed by the Covid-19 pandemic.

Second World War
Among many schools evacuated to Cornwall (notably Benenden Girls' School), 240 boys and 20 masters of Gresham's School were evacuated to the town from Holt, Norfolk, during the Second World War, between June 1940 and March 1944. Gresham's occupied the Bay Hotel and the Pentire Hotel.

Between 1940 and 1944, the Royal Air Force used hotels in Newquay as a Ground school for aircrew Initial Training Wings No 7, No 8, and No 40. Recruits were taught basic flying theory and service protocols, and were sorted into their likely future RAF trades, such as Pilots, Observers, Navigators, Wireless operators, and air gunners. The training took place in the Highbury Hotel and men were billeted in nearby hotels.

Several of the large hotels in Newquay were requisitioned as convalescent hospitals for the Army, Air Force, and Royal Navy. These were the Atlantic Hotel, the Headland Hotel, the Hotel Victoria, the Fistral Bay Hotel and St Rumons (now called the Esplanade).

Hospital and emergency services

Devon and Cornwall Constabulary maintains a substantial police station in Tolcarne Road. The modern fire station in Tregunnel Hill is run by Cornwall Fire and Rescue Service, and is the home of one of the two aerial ladder platforms based in Cornwall. The fire station has 24-hour cover during the summer and is day-staffed in the winter. A separate specialist fire service is maintained at Newquay Airport.

Ambulance cover is provided by the South Western Ambulance Service NHS Trust from an Ambulance Station in St Thomas Road. Cornwall Air Ambulance is also based just outside the town, alongside the airport. In addition, the airport at Newquay is one of ten UK bases for the Search and Rescue service, which is run by Bristow Helicopters on behalf of Her Majesty's Coastguard.

Newquay Hospital is also at the end of St Thomas Road, and is a local hospital catering for both in- and outpatients, with a number of clinics and a minor injuries unit. The nearest general hospital and full A+E department is in Truro. Proposals in recent years for the Newquay Growth Area, east of the present town, have included a new and larger hospital.

Newquay also has a 14-person coastguard rescue team based at Treloggan Industrial Park and a Royal National Lifeboat Institution station based in the harbour.

Transport

Rail 

Newquay railway station is the terminus of the Atlantic Coast Line from Par. The railway was originally built as a mineral line in the 1840s and ran mainly around the fringes of the built-up area, as it was then, to the harbour. A passenger service followed on 20 June 1876, and from then on the town developed quickly as a resort. The station is close to the beaches on the east side of the town centre.

Newquay handles daily direct services to and from Plymouth, Exeter and London between May and September. It is the only branch line terminus in Britain still served by scheduled intercity trains. Passenger services are operated under government contract by Great Western Railway, whose owner is FirstGroup.

History 
The goods line which would be acquired later by the Cornwall Minerals Railway was opened in 1846 from inland mines to the harbour, and was worked by horses. Parts of the old line from the present station to the harbour are still in existence: the most obvious section is a broad footpath from opposite the station in Cliff Road to East Street, known locally as the "tram track", and complete with a very railway-style overbridge. From East Street, the line continued towards the harbour along the present-day Manor Road.

The last trains ran through to Newquay Harbour in about 1924, but general goods traffic continued to reach Newquay railway station until 1964. The passenger station and its approaches were enlarged more than once, with additional carriage sidings being built at Newquay in the 1930s. The originally wooden viaduct just outside the station, which crosses the Trenance Valley, was rebuilt in 1874 to allow locomotives to run over the structure and then again just before World War II to carry double track, which extended until 1964 for approximately 1500m (1 mile) to Tolcarn Junction. The line is now single again, but the width of the viaduct is still obvious.

Tolcarn Junction was the point where a second passenger route left the Par line between 1906 and 1963. This branch ran to Chacewater, west of Truro, via Perranporth and St Agnes, and provided through trains to Truro and Falmouth.

Two of the three former platforms were taken out of use in 1987, but Network Rail had planned to restore one of the disused platforms to improve capacity.

Mid Cornwall Metro 
The Mid Cornwall Metro, which received provisional approval for government funding worth almost £50 million on 18 January 2023, will involve a number of upgrades to the Newquay branch. A second platform will be restored at Newquay and there will be other improvements to the terminus, including a bus interchange, as well as an additional crossing place at Tregoss Moor, between St Columb Road and Roche stations. The MCM is intended to provide a clockface hourly service between Newquay, Par, St Austell, Truro and Falmouth Docks.

Air

Newquay Airport provides links to many other parts of the United Kingdom. It is an HM Customs port because it also handles increasing numbers of foreign flights, both scheduled and chartered. Newquay is the principal airport for Cornwall, although there are several minor airfields elsewhere in the county.

Until 2008, Newquay Civil Airport (as it was formerly known) used the runway and other facilities of RAF St Mawgan, but in December 2008 the Ministry of Defence handed over most of the site to the recently formed Cornwall Airport Limited. The first stage of the conversion into a fully commercial airport was completed in 2011, although further substantial development is planned. The handover, which was due to take place at the end of 2008, was delayed for almost three weeks because of problems in obtaining the essential Civil Aviation Authority licence, which was withheld until further work had been carried out.

The name has changed several times since 2008, and the airport is now marketed as Cornwall Airport Newquay. However, the IATA code is still NQY.

Usage of the airport had been rising sharply until the Covid-19 pandemic in 2020-22. On summer Saturdays in 2018 there were almost 50 arrivals and departures, including flights to Germany and other continental countries.

Spaceport
Newquay has obtained a licence to operate as a spaceport, called Spaceport Cornwall. A decision had been expected about the sites of UK spaceports in the summer of 2017, but the additional general election in June 2017 delayed necessary legislation for a time. Cornwall's bid was supported by Cornwall Council and Cornwall & Isles of Scilly Local Enterprise Partnership. The proposal also included the related Cornish space tracking station at Goonhilly, which is near Helston in south Cornwall. On 16 July 2018 a new partnership was announced with Virgin Orbit to create the spaceport, with the intention of launching satellites from Newquay within three years. On the same day, the government confirmed that a grant worth £2 million would be available to developing spaceports. The planned first satellite from Newquay, Kernow Sat 1, was to measure ocean pollution and deforestation and was planned to be launched in summer 2022 (in the end, Kernow Sat 1 was not present on the first launch from Spaceport Cornwall in 2023). On 24 February 2022, the then Business Secretary, Kwasi Kwarteng, formally launched the construction of a £5.6m Centre for Space Technologies alongside the Spaceport, and the new Centre is expected to create 150 jobs. The first, unsuccessful, attempt to launch satellites took place on 9 January 2023.

Bus

There are regular bus services from Newquay to many parts of central and north Cornwall, including the neighbouring urban centres of St Austell and Truro as well as Boscastle, Bude, Camelford, Falmouth, Fowey, St Columb Major, Padstow, Perranporth, Redruth, Tintagel and Wadebridge. Services are operated by First Kernow and Go Cornwall Bus while the town is also served by National Express and Stagecoach Megabus coaches.  The bus station is in Manor Road, which runs parallel to the shopping area in Bank Street. A scheme to upgrade and improve the bus station with the additions of a new enclosed waiting area and accessible toilet began in February 2018 and was completed in July. Further changes occurred in April and May 2020, because Cornwall Council had awarded an eight-year contract to run subsidised services in the county to Go Cornwall, which also operates as Plymouth CityBus and is owned by the Go-Ahead Group.

Sport and leisure
Newquay has two non-league association football clubs. They are Newquay A.F.C. who play at Mount Wise Stadium and Godolphin Atlantic F.C. who play at Godolphin Way. Newquay Hornets rugby football club play at Newquay Sports Centre.

Newquay have a successful, four-team cricket club based at the SportsCentre. Their 1st XI currently compete in Cornwall's County One, and at the start of the century were a major power in regional cricket, winning the ECB Cornwall Premier League in 2003, boasting star players such as Ryan Driver, Tim Walton and Barry Purchase. Newquay's academy in the past 15 years has produced four full-Cornwall players — Rob Harrison, Neil Ivamy, Joe Crane and Adam Cocking, in addition to numerous County youth representatives. They have youth teams from age ranges Under 9 - Under 19. In 2016, their overseas professional was former Zimbabwean test match batsman Mark Vermeulen. In 2017, the teams all competed well in their respective Divisions, and have now gone down the route of not having a professional, instead of investing in improving the ground, coaching and infrastructure. Newquay is a prime destination for touring cricket sides and the club specialise in hosting touring teams.

Newquay also plays host to the Newquay Road Runners who are based at the sports centre.

Surfing

The resort is widely regarded as the surf capital of the UK. Newquay is a centre for the surf industry in Britain, with many surf stores, board manufacturers and hire shops in the town.

At the centre of Newquay's surfing status is Fistral Beach which has a reputation as one of the best beach breaks in Cornwall. Fistral is capable of producing powerful, hollow waves and holding a good sized swell.

Fistral Beach has been host to international surfing competitions for around 20 years now. The annual Boardmasters Festival takes place at Fistral beach, with a music festival taking place at Watergate Bay.

Newquay is also home to the reef known as the Cribbar. It was first surfed in September 1965 by Rodney Sumpter, Bob Head and Jack Lydgate and again in 1966, by Pete Russell, Ric Friar and Johnny McElroy and American Jack Lydgate. The recent explosion in interest in surfing large waves has seen it surfed more frequently by South African born Chris Bertish, who during a succession of huge clean swells in 2004, surfed the biggest wave ever seen there.

Towan, Great Western and Tolcarne beaches nearer the town and nearby Crantock and Watergate Bay also provide high quality breaks.

Notable people associated with Newquay

 William Golding, novelist, author of Lord of the Flies, winner of 1983 Nobel Prize in Literature, was born in Newquay
 Alexander Lodge (1881–1938) was an English inventor who did early work and held some patents on the spark plug
 Ruarri Joseph, singer-songwriter, lives in the Newquay area
 Richard Long, 4th Viscount Long, lived at The Island, a house on a rock linked to the mainland by a private suspension bridge
 Chris Morris, a former Sheffield Wednesday and Celtic footballer, was born in Newquay
 James Morrison, singer-songwriter, grew up in the Newquay area: he attended Treviglas College
 Neil Halstead, singer-songwriter, currently resides in the area
 Phillip Schofield, television presenter, attended Newquay Tretherras School
 John Coulson Tregarthen, naturalist and novelist, lived in Newquay
 Sir David Willcocks the choral conductor, organist and composer was born here in 1919
 Nicholas Charles Williams, English painter, is based in Newquay
 Richard David James (Aphex Twin), a musician/producer, resides in Newquay
 Charlotte Mary Matheson, novelist, lived at Porth Veor

Twinning
Newquay is twinned with Dinard in Brittany, France.

Newquay in films
 The Headland Hotel, next to Fistral Beach, has been used in several films, including Wild Things (1988) and The Witches (1990).
 The Beatles filmed part of the Magical Mystery Tour film in Newquay. Scenes were filmed at the Atlantic Hotel and Towan Beach.
 Some of the scenes in Blue Juice (1995) were filmed in Newquay.

Geography

Climate
As with the rest of the British Isles and South West England, Newquay experiences a maritime climate with cool summers and mild winters. The nearest Met Office weather station is St. Mawgan/Newquay Airport, about 3.5 miles to the north east of the town centre.

Geology
The bedrock underlying Newquay is the Devonian age Meadfoot Group, a succession of interbedded mudstones, siltstones and sandstones, with occasional beds of limestone. Quaternary age deposits of blown sand cover the bedrock in the western part of the town. Some mineralisation associated with the Cornubian granite batholith that intrudes into much of the peninsular is found in the western part of the town near Fistral Beach, in the form of lodes of lead and silver minerals.

See also

 List of topics related to Cornwall
 Penhallow Hotel fire, occurred in the town in 2007

References

External links

 Newquay Community Profile
 The Official Newquay Tourism website
 Newquay Town Council
 Newquay Old Cornwall Society 
 

 
Towns in Cornwall
Cornish Killas
Seaside resorts in Cornwall
Fishing communities in England
Populated coastal places in Cornwall